Collected Atrocities 2005–2008 is a compilation album by Gnaw Their Tongues, released on February 3, 2015 by Crucial Blast. The album comprises three EPs that had previously been issued on CD with several compilation and unreleased tracks.

Track listing

Personnel
Adapted from Collected Atrocities 2005–2008 liner notes.
 Maurice de Jong (as Mories) – vocals, instruments, recording, cover art

Release history

References

External links 
 
 Collected Atrocities 2005-2008 at Bandcamp

2015 compilation albums
Gnaw Their Tongues albums